Ayn Rand's Objectivism rejects an array of ideas and modes of living that it deems are primitive by nature and indicative of a primitive culture. Objectivism views primitive states of existence as being "savage" and mired in mysticism, fatalism, ignorance, superstition, poverty, passivity, and collectivism. The cure to such a society Objectivism holds is Western civilization, capitalism and modernity, which in its view brings with it reason, individualism, science, industrialization, and ultimately wealth.

Objectivists contend that Rousseauian romanticism of primitive life became the foundation for the 1960s' counterculture and New Left, which Rand vehemently opposed. Two specific groups that Rand controversially accused of being primitive "savages" were Native Americans and Arabs. Rand also outlined her broader anti-primitive views in various speeches, interviews, and in her book Return of the Primitive: The Anti-Industrial Revolution. Those anti-primitive views and their relevance to Objectivism have since been expounded on by individuals such as Leonard Peikoff and Michael Berliner, newsletters like The Objectivist, and groups such as the Ayn Rand Institute and Atlas Society.

Objectivism contends that by upholding reason and the value of the individual, a culture is able to reject the "primitive mentality that cower(s) before the forces of nature" and "the dictates of mystical authorities." Peter Schwartz of the Ayn Rand Institute has argued that there is a push in the present day to restore the aforementioned "medieval mentality" under the guise of tribalism, multiculturalism, and environmentalism. Schwartz believes that this leads to an anti-science and anti-technology mentality, which becomes subservient to the "mysticism of religion."

Rousseau and the New Left

According to the Objectivist-based Atlas Society, eighteenth century philosopher Jean-Jacques Rousseau offered an "idealized image of primitive man" who had not yet been "corrupted by civilization." The source of such primitivist views according to the Atlas Society was Rousseau's "antipathy to reason", and his postmodern hatred of individualism and capitalism. In this respect, Objectivism views Rousseau, who praised the authenticity of primitive modes of life, as the father of the nineteenth-century Romantic poets, which the Atlas Society contends ultimately became the inspiration for the counterculture of the 1960s and the New Left.

In surmising the New Left, Rand deemed that they could be summed up by the false accusation that "Capitalism defiles the beauty of your countryside." Furthermore, Rand predicted that following the Vietnam War, the New Left would disingenuously turn their "next big crusade" to the issue of pollution and clean air. However the true unstated goal of this crusade Rand believed was the destruction of capitalism and the "establishment of a global dictatorship."

The savage and tribal altruism
Objectivism rejects the notion of the noble savage. The founder of the Ayn Rand Institute, Leonard Peikoff, uses the example that if you were to "study savages in the jungle", you would find that they are mentally "undeveloped" and thus "have no method and no discovery of any control over their minds yet." Peikoff refers to such "savages" as "imagistic, pre-conceptual ... fear ridden, (and) emotional ridden", with a "primitive type of mind" comparable to a baby or an animal.

Rand states that "the morality of altruism" itself is primitive and "tribal phenomenon", rooted in the fact that in her view "prehistoric men were physically unable to survive without clinging to a tribe for leadership and protection against other tribes." In Rand's assessment, modern "theoreticians of altruism" such as Immanuel Kant, John Dewey, B. F. Skinner, and John Rawls were out to dominate our "magnificent scientific civilization" with the "morality of a prehistoric savagery."

Environmentalism and industrialization

Rand rejected environmentalism "as a social principle", stating that it "condemns cities, culture, industry, technology, (and) the intellect" by advocating man's "return to nature", which she described as "the state of grunting subanimals digging the soil with their bare hands." Referring to environmentalists as propagandists and "vultures", Rand held that they envisioned a state of nature and natural harmony which placed man on the level of sea urchins or polar bears. Noting that man's life expectancy was around 30 years of age during the preindustrial Middle Ages, Rand recommended that "anyone over 30 years of age, give a silent thank you to the nearest, grimiest, sootiest smokestacks you can find."

Objectivism's societal examples of primitiveness

Native Americans and colonization
Rand's Objectivism rejects primitivism and tribalism, while arguing that they are symptomatic of an "anti-industrial" mentality. Rand claims that the indigenous Native Americans had no claim to property rights. When Rand addressed West Point Military Academy cadets in 1974 and was asked about the dispossession and "cultural genocide" of Native Americans which occurred en route to forming the United States, she replied that indigenous people "had no right to a country merely because they were born here and then acted like savages .... Since the Indians did not have the concept of property or property rights – they didn't have a settled society, they had predominantly nomadic tribal "cultures" – they didn't have rights to the land, and there was no reason for anyone to grant them rights that they had not conceived of and were not using." Rand went on to opine that "in opposing the white man" Native Americans wished to "continue a primitive existence" and "live like animals or cavemen", surmising that "any European who brought with him an element of civilization had the right to take over this continent."

On Columbus Day of 1992, Michael Berliner, executive director of the Ayn Rand Institute, reiterated this philosophical position and hailed the European conquest of North America, describing the indigenous culture as "a way of life dominated by fatalism, passivity, and magic." Western civilization, Berliner claimed, brought "reason, science, self-reliance, individualism, ambition, and productive achievement" to a people who were based in "primitivism, mysticism, and collectivism", and to a land that was "sparsely inhabited, unused, and underdeveloped." In a 1999 follow up editorial for Capitalism Magazine, Berliner, who was also senior adviser to the Ayn Rand Archives, expressed objectivism's "reverence" for Western civilization which he referred to as an "objectively superior culture" that "stands for man at his best." In response to Michael Berliner's critiques of Native American society, Robert McGhee, an archaeologist with the Canadian Museum of Civilization, stated that the United States Constitution and its concept of democracy "may owe much, to the political concepts of the Iroquois and other Native peoples." Harvard Law Professor Alison L. Lacroix counters in her work The Ideological Origins of American Federalism that the case consists of purely circumstantial evidence that does not actually support any hypothesis that suggests Native American influence on the Founding Fathers.

Additionally, in 2005, the Ayn Rand Center for Individual Rights rejected a proposal by the U.S. Senate Committee on Indian Affairs to formally apologize to Native Americans, stating that the proper response from "Indians" instead should be "gratitude." The Ayn Rand Center's remarks went on to decree the transfer of Western civilization to the Americas as "one of the great cultural gifts in recorded history, affording Indians almost effortless access to centuries of European accomplishments in philosophy, science, technology, and government", remarking that "before Europeans arrived, the scattered tribes occupying North America lived in abject poverty, ignorance, and superstition".

Arabs versus Israel

Rand's rejection of what she deemed to be "primitivism" also extended to the Arab–Israeli conflict. Following the Arab-Israeli War of 1973, Rand denounced Arabs as "primitive" and "one of the least developed cultures" who "are typically nomads." Consequently, Rand contended Arab resentment for Israel was a result of the Jewish state being "the sole beachhead of modern science and civilization on their (Arabs) continent", while decreeing that "when you have civilized men fighting savages, you support the civilized men, no matter who they are."

When asked about the topic during a May 1979 episode of The Phil Donahue Show, Ayn Rand repeated her support for Israel against the Arabs under the reasoning that they were "the advanced, technological, civilized country amidst a group of almost totally primitive savages [...] who resent Israel because it’s bringing industry, intelligence, and modern technology into their stagnation."

Leonard Peikoff, who was associate editor with Ayn Rand for The Objectivist, reiterated Rand's earlier stance in a 1996 editorial for Capitalism Magazine, noting that "(Israeli) land was not stolen from the nomadic tribes meandering across the terrain, any more than the early Americans stole this country (the U.S.) from the primitive, warring Indians."

See also

 Anarcho-primitivism
 Deindustrialization
 Deep ecology
 Colonialism
 Eurocentrism
 Eco-communalism
 History of technology
 Idea of Progress
 Modernization theory
 Neo-Luddism
 Neo-Tribalism
 Postmodernism
 Primitive communism
 Distributism

Notes

References

External links
 Avatar: The Atlas Shrugged Of The Left
 Property Rights and Native Americans by The Atlas Society
 Man vs. Nature by Peter Schwartz, Ayn Rand Center for Individual Rights
 Columbus: A Moral Retrospective – a review of Michael Berliner's debate with Ed Castillo by Tim C. Mazur

Objectivism (Ayn Rand)